Grotesque is a 2003 crime novel by Japanese writer Natsuo Kirino, most famous for her novel Out. It was published in English in 2007, translated by Rebecca Copeland. Publisher Knopf censored the American translation, removing a section involving underage male prostitution, as it was considered too taboo for U. S. audiences.

Plot summary
The book is written in the first person for all parts and follows a woman whose sister and old school friend have been murdered. The narrator of Grotesque is unnamed and forever lives under the shadow of her younger-by-a-year sister Yuriko, who is unimaginably beautiful and the center of all attention. The narrator hates her younger sister Yuriko because she was always looked down when being compared with Yuriko.

While the narrator is smart, responsible and plain looking, Yuriko is strikingly beautiful but flighty and irresponsible. Yuriko's diary does show an ability to think for herself that her sister always denied out of rage. Everyone is automatically drawn to Yuriko's beauty, who realizes her power on men and soon afterwards also realizes she can make money out of it. From there she becomes a full-time prostitute, and declines as she ages. As the novel progresses, the reader is introduced to many other characters with whom the narrator comes in contact at her highly prestigious Q High School.

With time, the narrator grows to hate almost everyone, her classmates, her parents, co-workers etc. This in turn only isolates her more and ends up having jumping from bad job to another bad one.

When both Yuriko and Kazue turn into prostitutes, they are murdered less than a year apart and in the same gruesome fashion. Then the narrator comes in possession of their personal journals and her life is entwined with theirs to the point of meeting and adopting Yuriko's handsome but blind son, Yurio.

In the original Yurio becomes a prostitute in order to earn money. The narrator wants to join him but due to her age, she has no customers. For this reason, she becomes Yurio's pimp instead. However, eventually their relationship turns sour. At the end, she decides to take up the offer from a costumer who is curious about her being a 40-year old virgin. The English version skips Yurio's incursion with prostitution and the narrator's involvement with his activities. There is a mention of her accepting the offer of her first client, but it is left up to interpretation if this really happens or is a figment of the narrator's imagination.

Structure and style
The novel is divided into 8 parts: parts 1, 2, 4, 6 and 8 are told by the unnamed narrator; part 3 is the journal of Yuriko, the narrator's sister; part 5 is the written report by Zhang who is accused of the two murders; and part 7 is the journal of the narrator's school friend, Kazue Sato.

Themes
Fordham, the reviewer in The Times, writes that the book is about women struggling to be taken seriously by men, and their consequent retreat into "coldness, violence and dehumanisation". All want control in their lives, and seek it in different ways. The reviewer for The Telegraph, however, sees the theme in terms of Japanese society and culture, writing that "Grotesque is not so much a crime novel as a brilliant, subversive character study. Kirino's real concerns are social, not criminal; her true villain is 'the classist society so firmly embedded in Japan' which pushes her protagonists along the road to prostitution".

Overall, then, as well as exploring women's psyches, particularly in terms of their relationships with men, Kirino explores women in the context of Japanese society and how its rigid hierarchy operates against their ability to fully participate within it.

The novel is said to have been loosely modeled on the victim of the unsolved murder of Yasuko Watanabe (aka the TEPCO OL murder case), which occurred on March 9, 1997.

References

2003 Japanese novels
Novels by Natsuo Kirino
Japanese crime novels
Bungeishunjū books